The Circuit de Spa-Francorchamps, frequently referred to as Spa, is a  motor-racing circuit located in Stavelot, Belgium. It is the current venue of the Formula One Belgian Grand Prix, hosting its first Grand Prix in 1925, and has held a Grand Prix every year since 1985 (except 2003 and 2006).

Spa also hosts several other international events including the 24 Hours of Spa, the World Endurance Championship 6 Hours of Spa-Francorchamps. It is also home to the Uniroyal Fun Cup 25 Hours of Spa, one of the longest motor races in the world.

The circuit has undergone several redesigns through its history, most extensively in 1979 when the track was modified and shortened from a  circuit using public roads to a  permanent circuit due to safety concerns with the old circuit.

Despite its name, the circuit is not in Spa but lies in the vicinity of the town of Francorchamps within the boundaries of the municipality of Stavelot, with a part in the boundaries of Malmedy.

Track configurations

Original layout

Designed in 1920 by Jules de Thier and Henri Langlois Van Ophem, the original course used public roads linking the Belgian towns of Francorchamps, Malmedy, and Stavelot. The track's inaugural race was planned for August 1921, but was cancelled when only one driver entered. The first car race was held at the circuit in 1922, and 1924 saw the first running of the now famous 24 Hours of Francorchamps race. The circuit was first used for Grand Prix racing in 1925.

The original Spa-Francorchamps circuit was essentially a speed course, with drivers managing higher average speeds than on other race tracks. At the time, the Belgians took pride in having a very fast circuit, and to improve average speeds, in 1939 the former slow uphill U-turn at the bottom of the Eau Rouge creek valley, called the Ancienne Douane (until 1920, there was a German Empire customs office here), was cut short with a faster sweep straight up the hill, called the Raidillon. At Eau Rouge, southbound traffic was allowed to use the famous uphill corner, while the opposite downhill traffic had to use the old road and U-turn behind the grandstands, rejoining the race track at the bottom of Eau Rouge.

The old race track continued through the now-straightened Kemmel curves to the highest part of the track ( above the lowest part), then went downhill into Les Combes, a fast, slightly banked downhill left-hand corner towards Burnenville, passing this village in a fast right hand sweep. Near Malmedy, the Masta straight began, which was only interrupted by the Masta Kink between farm houses before arriving at the town of Stavelot. Then, the track progressed through an uphill straight section with a few bends called La Carriere, going through two high-speed turns (the former being an unnamed right-hand turn, and the latter named Blanchimont) before braking very hard for the La Source hairpin, and that rejoined the downhill start finish section (as opposed to today where the start–finish section is before La Source).

Spa is located in the Belgian Ardennes countryside, and the old circuit was, and still is, used as everyday public road, and there were houses, trees, electric poles, fields and other obstacles located right next to the track. Before 1970, there were no safety modifications of any kind done to the circuit and the conditions of the circuit were, aside from a few straw bales, virtually identical to everyday civilian use. Former Formula One racing driver and team owner Jackie Oliver was quoted as saying "if you went off the road, you didn't know what you were going to hit".

Spa-Francorchamps was the fastest road circuit in Europe at the time, and it had a reputation for being dangerous and very fast – it demanded calmness from drivers, and most were frightened of it. The old Spa circuit was unique in that speeds were consistently high with hardly any let-up at all for three to four minutes. If a driver lifted the throttle more than expected, then whole seconds, not tenths, would be lost. The slightest error of any kind carried multiple harsh consequences, but this also worked inversely: huge advantages could be gained if a driver came out of a corner slightly faster.

Like the Le Mans circuit, which also ran on public roads, Spa became notorious for fatal accidents. At the 1960 Belgian Grand Prix, two drivers, Chris Bristow and Alan Stacey, were killed within 15 minutes (although Stacey's accident was caused by a bird hitting him in the face) and Stirling Moss had crashed at Burnenville during practice and was severely injured. When Armco crash barriers were added to the track in 1970, deaths became less frequent, but the track was still notorious for other factors. The Ardennes forest had very unpredictable weather and there were parts where it was raining and the track was wet, and other parts where the sun was shining and the track was completely dry. This factor was a commonality on long circuits, but the unpredictable weather at Spa, combined with the fact that it was a track with all but one corner being high-speed, made it one of the most dangerous race tracks in the world (if not the most). As a result, the Formula 1 and motorcycle Grands Prix and 1000 km sportscar races saw smaller than usual fields at Spa because most drivers and riders feared the circuit and did not like racing there. Multiple fatalities during the 1973 and 1975 24 Hours of Spa touring car races more or less sealed the old circuit's fate, and by 1978, the last year Spa was in its original form, the only major races held there were the Belgian motorcycle Grand Prix and the Spa 24 Hours touring car race; the 1000 km World Sportscar Championship race no longer took place after 1975 and did not come back until 1982. 

In 1969, the Belgian Grand Prix was boycotted by the F1 drivers because of the extreme danger of Spa. There had been ten car racing fatalities in total at the track in the 1960s, including five in the two years previous. The drivers demanded changes made to Spa which were not possible on short notice, so the Belgian Grand Prix was dropped that year. Armco barriers were added to the track and sections of it were improved (especially the Stavelot and Hollowell sections), just like they had been added for the 1969 Le Mans race. One last race there the following year on the improved track was still not satisfactory enough (even after a temporary chicane was added at Malmedy just for that race) for the drivers in terms of safety, and even with the chicane, the drivers averaged over  during the race. For the 1971 race, the track owners and authorities had not brought the track up to date with mandatory safety measures, and the race was cancelled. Formula One would not return to Spa until 1983 on the modern track.

Masta Kink

The Masta Kink "was by far the most difficult corner in the world", according to Jackie Stewart, requiring skill and bravery in equal measure to get it right. After a long run from Malmedy, the cars would reach top speed before having to negotiate Masta, a high speed left-right chicane, and a good exit speed was vital as it was followed by another long straight run to Stavelot. The speed in this sector could reach .

Masta was removed from F1 racing after the 1970 season. Jackie Stewart's crusade to improve safety in racing was set in motion by his crash there in 1966, when his BRM ended upside-down in a ditch near a farmhouse on the outside of the corner, with fuel gushing out of the tank onto Stewart, who had broken ribs. At this point, many of the Formula One drivers disliked Spa (including Stewart and Jim Clark, who had some of his greatest wins there) because of the immense speeds that were constant on the track. While he was spectating at the 1972 12 Hours of Sebring, Stewart attempted to organise a boycott of the Spa 1000 km race that year, a move that was not respected by many of the drivers, because Spa was still popular with racing drivers outside of Formula One. Stewart later described the old Spa circuit in 1986 as being as "ferocious as a tiger", and he later described Masta in an interview in 2011 as perhaps the hardest corner on any racetrack he raced on in his career; even more so than Eau Rouge.

Another particularly gruesome story comes from the 1972 24-hour touring car race. During one of his pit stops at night, Hans-Joachim Stuck shouted to his co-driver Jochen Mass over the noise from the cars that he should "look out for body parts at the Masta Kink". Mass arrived there expecting to see pieces from cars all over the road but was appalled to discover it was in fact the remains of a marshal.

After Masta, and at the end of the subsequent Hollowell Straight, there used to be a sharp hairpin at the entrance to the town itself, which was later bypassed by a quicker, banked right hand corner. Another fast section of road in the forest leads to Blanchimont. Here, the new short Grand Prix track of 1979 joins the old layout.

Eighteen Formula One World Championship Grands Prix were run on the Spa-Francorchamps circuit's original configuration, which was boycotted by F1 in 1969, before the revised circuit banished it to the history books in 1979.

New layout

Over the years, the Spa course has been modified several times. In 1930, the chicane at Malmedy was eliminated and bypassed, making the course even faster, but the chicane was re-installed in 1935, albeit slightly different. In 1939, "Virage de l'Ancienne Douane" was eliminated and cut short, thus giving birth to the Eau Rouge/Raidillon uphill sweeping corner. In 1947, the chicane at Malmedy was again eliminated and bypassed, and was made part of the Masta Straight. The slight right-hander that was originally Hollowell (the corner before Stavelot after the second Masta Straight) was eliminated. And finally, instead of going through a slight left-hander that went into the town of Stavelot and a sharp right-hander at a road junction in Stavelot, a shortcut was built that became a very fast, very wide right-handed turn that bypassed Stavelot. In the final years of the old circuit, drivers could average . The start/finish line, which was originally on the downhill straight before Eau Rouge, was moved to the straight before the La Source hairpin in 1981. Like its predecessor, the new layout is still a fast and hilly route through the Ardennes where speeds in excess of  can be reached. Since its inception, the place has been famous for its unpredictable weather, where drivers are confronted with one part of the course being clear and bright while another stretch is rainy and slippery.

Eau Rouge

The most famous part of the circuit is the Eau Rouge and Raidillon combination. Having negotiated the La Source hairpin, drivers race down a straight to the point where the track crosses the Eau Rouge stream for the first time, before being launched steeply uphill into a sweeping left-right-left series of corners with a blind summit. Properly speaking, the Eau Rouge corner is only the left-hander at the bottom. The following right-hander that leads steeply uphill, which was introduced in 1939 to shortcut the original Ancienne Douane hairpin, is called . The corner requires an amount of skill from the driver to negotiate it well and the long Kemmel straight ahead produces good overtaking opportunities for drivers at the following "Les Combes" corner. The corner was tighter and narrower before 1970, allowing drivers to take the corner faster.

Double F1 World Champion Fernando Alonso explained:

A challenge for drivers has always been to take Eau Rouge/Raidillon flat out. World Champion Jacques Villeneuve once spoke of the effects of downforce, saying that to get through the corner the drivers have to drive faster, because downforce increases the faster a race car goes.

A loss of control through this section can often lead to a very heavy shunt, as usually the rear end of the car is lost and the resulting impact is often lateral. Several famous racing drivers have crashed while driving through Eau Rouge/Raidillon, including Stefan Bellof in a Porsche sportscar, Guy Renard during the 1990 24h of Spa-Francorchamps in a Toyota Corolla GT, and Alex Zanardi in a season-ending crash during a practice session of the 1993 Belgian Grand Prix in a Lotus. Jacques Villeneuve suffered a spectacular crash at the top of Raidillon in qualifying during the 1999 Belgian Grand Prix which he described as "My best-ever crash". His teammate Ricardo Zonta followed Villeneuve by having a similar accident later in practice, leading cartoonist Jim Bamber to show BAR boss Craig Pollock telling Zonta: "Jacques is the quickest through Eau Rouge, so go out there and do exactly what Jacques does…" It was revealed later that Villeneuve and Zonta had a personal bet to see if either could take the corner flat out.

Following the deaths of Roland Ratzenberger and Ayrton Senna at Imola in 1994, the following F1 races saw the introduction of chicanes made up from stacked tyres. The entry to Eau Rouge was obstructed in such a way in 1994, although it was returned to its previous configuration the following year. The corner was slightly modified for the 2002 Belgian Grand Prix.

When fans first got to see the course configuration at the start of the weekend of the 2005 Turkish Grand Prix, they noted that an uphill kink on the back straight was very similar to Eau Rouge; the kink was therefore jokingly dubbed "Faux Rouge" (a pun on the name of the original Spa corner using the French word "faux", meaning "false").

Blanchimont

The Blanchimont high-speed left-hand turn, present in both the old  circuit and the new, shorter,  track, is the final sweeping corner of the track before the chicane, which leads to the pit straight.

Problems have also occurred in lower classes of racing with Tom Kristensen having a very violent crash in a Formula 3000 car in 1997 after running wide on the entry to the Blanchimont turn and subsequently hitting the wall, throwing the monocoque back out in the middle of the track, where it was hit by numerous cars before coming to a complete halt.

The run-off area is narrower than in other turns taken at this speed, and behind the protective barriers there is a 7–8 metre drop. This is the first turn taken by the cars after the new track rejoins the route of the old 14 km track. Blanchimont was also the scene where in 1992 after Érik Comas had crashed heavily during Friday's session, Ayrton Senna stopped, disembarked his car and sprinted to help the injured driver, with other cars driving past at racing speeds.

Jacky Ickx corner
From the 2018 Belgian Grand Prix turn 11 has been called the Jacky Ickx corner as a tribute to his career. The corner was formerly known by most drivers as "speakers corner" because the circuit's public address announcer could see the cars for the first time after the cars disappeared into the forest past Raidillon.  There are two versions of Jacky Ickx as of 2022, the car turn and a turn inside of it for motorcycles.

Problems and renovations
Due to the introduction of the Television Without Frontiers Directive (1989), tobacco advertising and sponsorship on television were banned within the European Union from 1991. Formula One faced a major threat regarding races in its historical European heartland. Due to these political and legislative circumstances, the Grand Prix at Spa was left out of the 2003 calendar as a response to the internal tobacco legislation in Belgium. The event was tagged as a world class event within the national senate, and thus it was saved for the 2004 Formula One season. The final Bus Stop chicane was reprofiled for 2004 with an additional sweep to the right.

The organiser of the event went bankrupt in late 2005, and therefore the planned improvements to the race track and paddock had not yet been made. The Wallonia government stepped in and provided the necessary funds, but too late for the 2006 race to take place.

Redevelopment for the 2007 season
With a new financial backer, the renovation started on 6 November 2006 and finished in May 2007, costing around €19 million. The Bus Stop chicane was moved back towards Blanchimont and the La Source hairpin moved forward. This allowed more space for the new pit lane, and gave a longer start/finish straight.

Modifications
New asphalt runoff was added to the inside and outside of Les Combes for the 2010 race, in line with the prevailing trends at other Formula One circuits. Prior to the 2013 race, drainage grooves were cut into the asphalt on the start–finish straight, underneath the first 11 grid slots. Drivers were initially concerned that this would affect grip at the start.

Eau Rouge and Raidillon safety concerns 

In Spa Francorchamps' tenure as a permanent racing facility, after it was removed from the public road network in 2000, there have been multiple accidents in the Eau Rouge/Raidillon combination. In the day and age where safety is paramount to many racing organizations and governing bodies like the Fédération Internationale de l'Automobile, these crashes, of which some noteworthy ones are listed below, opened up public debate whether the Eau Rouge/Raidillon combination was deemed unsafe. Criticism centred around the nature of the tyre barrier and run-off area of Raidillon, which tended to bounce out-of-control cars back onto the track rather than collect them.

In October 2020 the circuit announced that gravel traps would be placed at La Source, Raidillon, Blanchimont, Les Combes and Stavelot. The runoff areas of some corners including Raidillon would be expanded. It was part of an €80 million upgrade to the circuit that would make it able to hold motorcycle races. The upgrade will also include a grandstand at the top of the Eau Rouge/Raidillon hill. The upgrades were completed in March 2022, ready for the FIM EWC race, due to be held in June.  The circuit is also shortened, as Jacky Ickx corner is bypassed in favour of a shorter section with more runoff for motorcycles.

Fatal crash of Formula 2 driver Anthoine Hubert in 2019 
During the Formula 2 feature race in late August, a serious incident between Anthoine Hubert and Juan Manuel Correa occurred shortly after Raidillon on the Kemmel Straight. As the second lap began, Trident driver Giuliano Alesi lost control of his car as he climbed the Raidillon curve due to a puncture he had received earlier, causing his car to spin and hit the left wall of the circuit, tearing off his rear wing and spreading debris onto the track. As another Trident driver, Ralph Boschung reached the crest of Raidillon, he slowed down and moved towards the run-off area to avoid Alesi's damaged car and the field of debris. Hubert, who was following Boschung closely and had no view of what had happened to Alesi, moved right to avoid Boschung's slowing car, clipping Boschung's right rear wheel with his front wing. Hubert's car crashed into the tyre barrier on the right side of the track at an acute angle and was deflected sideways into the path of Charouz driver Juan Manuel Correa, who struck it on the left side in the driver seat area.

The incident resulted in the death of Hubert and serious injury to Correa with the feature race being abandoned and the scheduled sprint race a day later being cancelled too, whilst the Formula 1 Belgian Grand Prix went ahead.

2021 W Series and Formula One incidents 
During the qualifying session of the W Series, rain started to fall, affecting the grip. This caused a serious incident that involved six cars crashing into each other. Sarah Moore was the first driver to lose control of her car, spinning into the barrier at Raidillon. Abbie Eaton also lost the car and spun into the same barrier. She bounced back into Moore at low speed. Beitske Visser lost the rear end, spun around and went straight into Eaton and Moore, causing Eaton to become airborne. Ayla Agren did the same as Visser, spinning and running into Moore and an airborne Eaton. Belén García then hit all four cars, causing Visser to become airborne and mount the tyre barrier. The final car of Fabienne Wohlwend then hit Beitske Visser head on, causing Visser to spin into the track and roll over. The incident ended with cars all over the track and run off areas. All drivers were checked as a precaution, and Visser and Agren were sent to hospital for x-rays and further checks. Eventually, all drivers were cleared and unharmed.

Just one day after the W Series crash, Formula One held its qualifying session in heavy rain. In the third segment of qualifying, many drivers were complaining that the conditions were not safe and that the session should be delayed or red flagged. Lando Norris then had a snap of oversteer, and subsequently corrected but then aquaplaned into the tyre barrier at Raidillon. His McLaren then spun into the track while crossing the racing line. Norris was taken to hospital for x-rays, but was cleared to race the next day.

After this crash and the W Series incident just a day before, drivers from all series were calling for changes to that section of the track. Jack Aitken, who a month earlier suffered a broken collarbone and fractured vertebra after a crash at Raidillon in the 2021 24 Hours of Spa, said "everyone has gotten the picture of what needs changing" on social media, regarding the W Series crash. Guanyu Zhou stated "Eau Rouge corner in Spa needs to making a change," while Pietro Fittipaldi said "they need to do something to Eau Rouge to make it safer.” Carlos Sainz Jr. insisted the "corner maybe needs a bit of fine-tuning still." Sacha Fenestraz, Jake Hughes, Daniel Ricciardo and Toto Wolff all agreed changes need to be made immediately to make the circuit safer.

Other incidents 
Multiple other incidents have happened at the Eau Rouge/Raidillon section of the circuit. These include crashes for Kevin Magnussen in 2016, where he managed to walk away with only minor injuries; Pietro Fittipaldi in 2018, where he broke his leg and Jack Aitken in 2021, where he broke his collarbone.

Redevelopment for the 2022 season
Ahead of the 2022 FIM EWC 24H Spa EWC Motos race and 2022 F1 Grand Prix, the circuit underwent a major facility and safety facility redevelopment which had been planned since . Extra run-off was added to the Eau Rouge/Raidillon part of the course – changes made in response to several big accidents in recent years at that section of the track, including the fatal accident of Anthoine Hubert during the 2019 Spa-Francorchamps Formula 2 round. In addition, gravel traps were added to six corners on the circuit, these being: La Source, Raidillon, Blanchimont, Les Combes, Stavelot and Pouhon. The track has also been resurfaced for this year's event altering track grip levels, with Max Verstappen the first driver to run a Formula One car around the renovated circuit in a Red Bull RB7. Jarno Zeffelli, head of Dromo Circuit Design, the company who carried out the renovations, revealed twenty possible different iterations of Eau Rouge were evaluated, with the selected iteration chosen with the help of form of ex-Formula One drivers Thierry Boutsen and Emanuele Pirro and fine tuned with simulations for Formula One and GT cars.

Spa-Francorchamps is set to be part of the 2023 Formula 1 calendar.

Other racing series
Besides Formula 1 other races in different motorsports classes are hosted at Spa-Francorchamps. The most notable ones are the FIA World Endurance Championship, FIM Endurance World Championship, Intercontinental GT Challenge, GT World Challenge Europe, Formula 2, Formula 3, the RCN, Motorbike Endurance, and previously the DTM, ADAC GT Masters and the WTCC. The most famous long-distance and sports car races are the Spa 24 Hours and the 1000 km Spa. The circuit also hosts a 24-hour 2CV race.

 Current events

 April: FIA World Endurance Championship 6 Hours of Spa-Francorchamps, Porsche Carrera Cup Germany, Porsche Carrera Cup Benelux
 May: International GT Open, Euroformula Open Championship, TCR Europe Series, 24H Series 12 Hours Spa, Eurocup-3, F4 Spanish Championship, Italian F4 Championship, Renault Clio Cup Europe, Fun Cup Franco Fun Festival, Spa-Classic
 June: FIM Endurance World Championship 24H Spa EWC Motos, Sidecar World Championship, Alpine Elf Europa Cup Spa Euro Race, Supercar Challenge, GB3 Championship, FFSA GT Championship, French F4 Championship
 July: Formula One Belgian Grand Prix, Intercontinental GT Challenge Spa 24 Hours, GT World Challenge Europe, Formula 2 Championship, FIA Formula 3 Championship, Porsche Supercup, GT4 European Series, Formula Regional European Championship, Fun Cup 25 Hours of Spa
 August: Formula One Belgian Grand Prix, Formula 2 Championship, FIA Formula 3 Championship, Porsche Supercup, Youngtimer Festival Spa
 September: European Le Mans Series 4 Hours of Spa, Le Mans Cup, Ligier European Series, Ferrari Challenge Europe
 October: FIA Masters Historic Formula One Championship Spa Six Hours, Supercar Challenge Spa Racing Festival

 Former events
 ADAC Formula 4 (2015, 2022)
 ADAC GT Masters (2013, 2015)
 Auto GP (2002–2004, 2006–2008, 2010)
 BOSS GP (2003, 2008–2011, 2020)
 BPR Global GT Series (1994, 1996)
 British GT Championship (1998–2000, 2003, 2009–2011, 2014–2019, 2021–2022)
 Deutsche Tourenwagen Masters (2005, 2020, 2022)
 European Formula Two Championship (1981–1982)
 European Touring Car Championship (1966–1973, 1976, 1982–1986, 1988, 2002–2004)
 European Touring Car Cup (2002–2004)
 FFSA GT Championship (1998, 2008, 2013–2015, 2019, 2021–2022)
 FIA European Formula 3 Cup (2004)
 FIA Formula 3 European Championship (2012, 2014–2018)
 FIA Formula 3 International Trophy (2011)
 FIA GT Championship (1997, 2001–2009)
 FIA GT1 World Championship (2010)
 FIA Sportscar Championship (1999–2003)
 FIA World Rallycross Championship World RX of Benelux (2019, 2021–2022)
 Formula 3 Euro Series (2005)
 Formula Renault 2.0 Alps (2011–2015)
 Formula Renault 2.0 West European Cup (1999, 2008–2009)
 Formula Renault Eurocup (2004, 2008–2020)
 French Supertouring Championship (2000–2001)
 GP2 Series Spa-Francorchamps GP2 round (2005, 2007–2016)
 GP3 Series (2010–2018)
 Grand Prix motorcycle racing Belgian motorcycle Grand Prix (1949–1979, 1981–1986, 1988–1990)
 GT2 European Series (2021–2022)
 International Formula 3000 (1985–1987, 1989, 1991–2002, 2004)
 Racecar Euro Series (2012)
 Sidecar World Championship (1949–1979, 1981–1990, 2022)
 Super Tourenwagen Cup (1994–1995)
 Superbike World Championship (1992)
 TCR International Series (2016–2017)
 World Series Formula V8 3.5 (2006–2017)
 World Sportscar Championship (1953, 1963–1975, 1981–1990)
 World Touring Car Championship WTCC Race of Belgium (1987, 2005, 2014)
 W Series (2021)

Layout history

Lap records

The unofficial all-time track record set during a race weekend is 1:41.252, set by Lewis Hamilton in a Mercedes-AMG F1 W11 EQ Performance, during final qualifying for the 2020 Belgian Grand Prix. The official lap record for the current circuit layout is 1:46.286, set by Valtteri Bottas during the 2018 Belgian Grand Prix. As of July 2022, the fastest official race lap records of the modern Spa-Francorchamps circuit for several top series have been listed as:

In popular culture
As the long-time home of the Belgian Grand Prix and its location within the Ardennes forests it has been a popular backdrop for all kinds of fictional media, from appearances in comics and motion pictures, to regular appearances in dozens of video games going back into the 1980s.

Tour de France
The circuit has been used several times in the Tour de France cycling race. In 1980, the circuit was part of an individual time trial stage, won by Bernard Hinault; while in 1989, several laps of the circuit were completed before the finish of the third stage, which was won by 's Raúl Alcalá. In 2017, the circuit was used as part of the third stage, starting in Verviers, Belgium and ending in Longwy, France.

Climate
The area of Spa-Francorchamps is often rainy or having cool air temperatures, which has led to Formula One events such as the 1998 14-car pileup on a waterlogged track and the dramatic finish to the 2008 event, when rain fell during the last few laps after an all-dry race. The Royal Meteorological Institute runs weather stations both in Stavelot and in Malmedy, which both show similar oceanic climates with some interior influence. Although temperatures generally often stay above freezing in winter, snowfall is quite common. During summer, temperatures most often remain in the low 20s, with frequent cloud cover and showers. With the World Endurance race running in spring and the Formula One race in late summer, hot temperatures during high-profile events are very rare.

See also 
 List of Circuit de Spa-Francorchamps fatalities
 Nürburgring (nearby fellow historical circuit in Germany).

Notes

References

External links

Circuit de Spa-Francorchamps
One lap at Spa Classic 2011 on Kinomap
BBC guide to the track
BBC Belgian GP circuit guide
Circuit de Spa-Francorchamps history and statistics
Circuit de Spa-Francorchamps on Google Maps (current Formula 1 tracks)
Historic Circuit de Spa-Francorchamps on Google Maps (1922)
Spa Upgrade Work Begins
Spectator testimonial of visiting Spa-Francorchamps
Circuit info from official F1 site

 
Formula One circuits
Grand Prix motorcycle circuits
Pre-World Championship Grand Prix circuits
Superbike World Championship circuits
World Touring Car Championship circuits
World Rallycross circuits
Circuit de Spa-Francorchamps
Motorsport venues in Belgium
Circuit de Spa-Francorchamps
Circuit de Spa-Francorchamps
Belgian Grand Prix
1920 establishments in Belgium